National Fuel Gas Company (NYSE: NFG) is a diversified energy company with $6.2 billion in assets distributed among the following five operating segments: Exploration and Production (Seneca Resources Company, LLC), Pipeline and Storage (National Fuel Gas Supply Corporation and Empire Pipeline, Inc.), Gathering (National Fuel Gas Midstream Company, LLC), Utility (National Fuel Gas Distribution Corporation), and Energy Marketing (National Fuel Resources, Inc. - NFR). National Fuel Gas was incorporated in 1902 and is based in Williamsville, New York.

The Utility segment sells natural gas or provides natural gas transportation services to more than 753,000 utility customers through a local distribution system located in western New York and northwestern Pennsylvania. The Pipeline and Storage 
segment provides interstate natural gas transportation and storage services for affiliated and 
non-affiliated companies through an integrated system of 2,972 miles of pipeline and 31 underground natural gas storage fields (including 4 storage fields co-owned with nonaffiliated companies). The Exploration and Production segment, headquartered in Houston, Texas (with an offices in Pittsburgh to support its Appalachian operations), explores for, develops and produces oil natural gas in the Appalachia Region. Seneca's primary focus is now the Marcellus and Utica Shales in Pennsylvania, where the company controls 1.2 million net prospective acres that includes stacked pay potential. The Energy Marketing segment markets natural gas to 
industrial, commercial, public authority and residential end users located in New York and Pennsylvania.

History
As one of the earliest gas utility companies in the United States, National Fuel Gas witnessed a number of technological firsts at its company or its subsidiaries.  Engineers at the company discovered that depleted underground gas fields could be modified to act as storage reservoirs.  Thus, the first such storage facility in the US was implemented at Zoar Field, about forty miles south of Buffalo.  This turned out to be a great financial asset to NFG in the 1940s and 1950s, when skyrocketing demand for natural gas led to extensive pipelines in the eastern states being connected to new pipelines and fields in the southwestern states.  NFG could thereby purchase huge quantities of cheaper summer gas from the southwest, pipe it to its New York storage fields, inject it into the ground, then retrieve it when demand and prices rose in the winter months.

The company was also the first in the industry to develop a gas-fired generator to produce electricity for cathodic protection to fight corrosion on pipelines.

In 1975, with the introduction of "Balanced Billing", the company claimed that it was "the only gas utility in the country" with a flexible plan for customers to pay bills in eleven equal monthly payments, with settlement of any overpayment or underpayment in the twelfth month.  This is a modified system of installment credit.

Its headquarters was located at 10 Lafayette Square until 2002 when the company relocated to 6363 Main St in the Buffalo suburb, Williamsville.

National Fuel Gas Co. is traded on the New York Stock Exchange under the ticker symbol NFG.  Its fiscal year ends September 30.

Subsidiaries
National Fuel's direct, wholly owned subsidiaries include Horizon Energy Development, Inc.; Horizon 
LFG, Inc.; Leidy Hub, Inc.; Data-Track Account Services, Inc.; Horizon Power, 
Inc.; Empire Pipeline, Inc., National Fuel Gas Midstream Company, LLC and Seneca Resources Company, LLC. Highland Field Services, LLC (HFS), a subsidiary of Seneca Resources Company, LLC, was established in 2015 to address the water management needs for Seneca Resources and other oil and gas companies in the Appalachian basin. HFS currently operates two facilities in Pennsylvania  - a water treatment plant in Kane, Pa. (Sergeant Township, McKean County) and the Clermont Storage Facility in Shippen Township, Cameron County, Pa. HFS also manages the EPA approved injection well in Highland Township, Elk County, Pa. and the injection wells in Brookfield Township, Ohio. Its HFS facility utilizes a zero liquid discharge process to manage, store and transport oil and gas liquid waste for reuse during drilling and hydraulic fracturing. This procedure reduces the impact on natural water resources by minimizing the need for freshwater. It is also the largest handler of produced water in the Appalachian Basin.  Seneca Resources completed its divestiture of its California assets in June 2022 after 35 years of operation.

Notes

External links 
  official National Fuel Gas Co. website
  Google Finance.com: Company profile of National Fuel Gas

Energy companies of the United States
Natural gas companies of the United States
Companies based in Buffalo, New York
Energy companies established in 1902
Non-renewable resource companies established in 1902
Companies based in New York (state)
Companies listed on the New York Stock Exchange